Hampstead Norreys Castle was a Norman castle in the village of Hampstead Norreys, Berkshire, England.

History

Hampstead Norreys Castle is a Norman motte and bailey castle overlooking the village of Hampstead Norreys, Berkshire, England. The motte is 25 m wide, and 4.2 m high, made of chalk. The contours of the top suggest that a timber tower or defensive structure was built on the motte. The site was originally believed to be a tumulus, until later work confirmed its Norman origins. Local historian David Ford suspects that the castle may have been constructed after the Norman conquest of England by Theodoric the Goldsmith.<ref>Hampstead Norreys Castle, Royal Berkshire History, accessed 14 June 2011.</ref>

Today the castle is surrounded by woodland and is a scheduled monument.

See also
Castles in Great Britain and Ireland
List of castles in England

Bibliography
 Grinsell, L.V. (1939) "Berkshire Barrows, Part IV," Berkshire Archaeological Journal 43, pp. 9–21. 
 Grinsell, L.V. (1936) "An Analysis and List of Berkshire Barrows," Berkshire Archaeological Journal'' 40, pp. 20–58.

References

Castles in Berkshire